Platydoris guarani is a species of sea slug, a dorid nudibranch, shell-less marine opisthobranch gastropod mollusks in the family Discodorididae.

Distribution
The distribution of Platydoris guarani ranges from northeastern to southeastern Brazil.

References

Discodorididae
Gastropods described in 2018